The Lytham St Annes Art Collection is a public art collection of over 240 artworks in Lytham St Annes, Lancashire. Fylde Borough Council are the custodians of the paintings, sculptures, prints and artefacts that are mostly held within the Lytham St Annes Town Hall. The collection was started in 1925 by the donation of Herd Lassie, painted by Richard Ansdell, to the townspeople of Lytham St Annes, Lancashire. It was donated by John Booth (1857–1941), son of the founder of the grocery store chain Booths. The collection of 25 works is now one of the largest public collections of Ansdell's paintings.

One of the most notable paintings in the collection is The Vision of Catherine of Aragon  (also called Queen Katherine's Dream) by Henry Fuseli, which is estimated to be worth about £1.5-2 million, according to a 2013 valuation by Christie's, making it by far the most valuable item in the collection.

In 2008 the Fylde Gallery was opened above the Booths grocery store in Lytham to display some of the collection, and it is periodically open to the public. In June 2013 the Fylde Decorative and Fine Arts Society was awarded £24,000 from the Heritage Lottery Fund to promote the collection.

Selected artists from the Lytham St Annes Art Collection
Selected artists include:

 Allegrain, Christophe-Gabriel
 Allom, Thomas
 Andreotti, Frederico
 Andrieux, Alfred Louis
 Ansdell, Richard
 Arnold, Patience
 Balshaw, Fred
 Baratti Fillipo
 Barber, Charles Burton
 Barker, W D
 Baxter, George
 Bayer, J
 Bennett, Alfred J
 Bennett, E
 Bond, Henry Winsor
 Bond, William J J C
 Bough, Samuel
 Boulard Il, Auguste
 Brierley, Anne
 Brown, Mather
 Brooke, Percy
 Buzzi, Achille
 Caffieri Hector
 Cant, Leslie
 Carter, Samuel John
 Catterall, F W
 Cattermole, Charles
 Chambers, George Junior
 Chauvel, Théophile
 Cignani, Carlo 
 Clausen, Sir George
 Constable, John
 Constantine, George Hamilton
 Cooper, Thomas Sidney
 Cox, David
 Craft, Percy R
 Creswick, Thomas
 Crossley,  W
 Crouse, Max (previously M Clause)
 Currie, Jessie
 de Blaas, Eugene
 de Breanski, Alfred Snr
 de Heusch, Jacob 
 de Hoog, Bernard
 Dumont, Edme
 van Dyck, Anthony      
 Dyson, Louise Hardy
 Earl, Thomas William
 Eastwood, Walter
 Elliot, H
 Elliot, James
 Elmore, Alfred W
 Ensor, Mary Annie
 Evans, Bernard Walter
 Faed, Thomas
 Farnetti, D 
 Farquharson, Joseph
 Fielding, Anthony Vandyke Copley
 Fitton, William
 Fox, Henry Charles
 Franchini, F S
 Frith, William Powell
 Frost, William Edward (attributed to the Circle of)
 Fuchs, Therese 
 Fuseli, Henry
 Gleave, W H
 Glendening, Alfred Augustus Jnr
 Glindoni, Henry Gillard
 Graham, Peter
 Greenhalgh, Thomas
 Grundy, Cuthbert Cartwright
 Hague, Joshua Anderson
 Hardy, Frederick Daniel
 Hayes, Edwin
 Hayes, George
 Herbert, Alfred 
 Hester, R Wallace
 Hider, Frank
 Hines, Frederick W
 Hirst, Norman 
 Hodgkinson, Peter
 Hogarth, William
 Hoppner, John
 Howarth, Albany E
 Huggins, William
 Ireland, Thomas Tayler
 Jackson, Fred Williams
 Kay-Hilton Jacqueline
 Kirchner, Raphael
 Landini, Andrea
 Landseer, Edwin Henry (after)
 Landseer, Thomas
 Langlois, Mark William
 Laporte, Emile Henri
 Leader, Benjamin Williams (after)
 Linnell, John
 Llangl, H
 Longshaw, Frank William
 Lutyens, Charles Augustus Henry
 Macullum, John Thomas Hamilton
 MacWhirter, John
 Marshall, Thomas Falcon
 McArthur, A E
 Mennie, James
 Millais, (after) John Everett  
 Millington, Caroline Alice                                    
 Mole, John Henry
 Morgan, John
 Morland, George
 Morris, Alfred
 Morris, John Charles
 Morris, J D  
 Mulraney
 Munkácsy, Mihály
 Myers, E
 Oswald, C W
 Partington, Harold
 Pedder, John 
 Piffard, Harold H
 Pratt, Joseph Bishop
 Procter, Henry
 Prout, John Skinner
 Pyne, James Baker 
 Rembrandt, van Rijn (after)
 Rheam, Henry M
 Richardson, Charles
 Rigaud, Hyacinthe
 Rigby, Cuthbert
 Rinaldi, Rinaldo
 Robury, Steve
 Roe, Clarence H
 Romney, George
 Sadler, Walter Dendy (after)
 Schneider, N N
 Scott, Hugh Berry
 Shaw, John
 Shayer, William
 Sheffield, George Jnr
 Smith, James Burrell
 Sonn, B (after Claus Meyer)
 Spence, Benjamin Edward
 Thompson
 Topham, Francis William
 Towers, Samuel
 Tucker, Edward Snr
 Turner, Joseph Mallord William
 Verboeckhoven, Eugene Joseph
 Vichi, Ferdinando
 Warburton, Stanley
 Wardleworth, J L
 Wasse, Arthur
 West, Benjamin (follower of)
 Westall, Richard
 White, Kathleen
 Williams, Harry (John Henry)
 Woodhead, Walter 
 Woodhouse, Susan 
 Woodhouse, William Arnold

References

External links
 Art UK

Lytham St Annes
Art collections in the United Kingdom